This is a list of Northern Irish football transfers for the 2022–23 winter transfer window. Only transfers featuring NIFL Premiership are listed.

NIFL Premiership

Note: Flags indicate national team as has been defined under FIFA eligibility rules. Players may hold more than one non-FIFA nationality.

Linfield

In:

Out:

Cliftonville

In:

Out:

Glentoran

In:

Out:

Crusaders

In:

Out:

Larne

In:

Out:

Coleraine

In:

Out:

Glenavon

In:

Out:

Ballymena United

In:

Out:

Dungannon Swifts

In:

Out:

Carrick Rangers

In:

Out:

Portadown

In:

Out:

Newry City

In:

Out:

See also
 2022–23 NIFL Premiership

References

External links
 Official site of the IFA
 Official site of the NIFL Premiership

Northern Ireland
Transfers
2022-23